Flassigny is a commune in the Meuse department in Grand Est in north-eastern France.

Geography
The river Othain forms all of the commune's eastern border; a Roman road forms most of its southern border.

See also
Communes of the Meuse department

References

Communes of Meuse (department)